Filip Lepieš (born 22 December 1999) is a Slovak footballer who currently plays for FO ŽP Šport Podbrezová as a midfielder.

Club career

FO ŽP Šport Podbrezová
Lepieš made his professional Fortuna Liga's debut for FO ŽP Šport Podbrezová on 5 March 2017 against MŠK Žilina.

References

External links
FK Senica profile
UEFA profile
Futbalnet profile

1999 births
Living people
Slovak footballers
Association football midfielders
FK Železiarne Podbrezová players
Slovak Super Liga players